The 1996–97 Butler Bulldogs men's basketball team represented Butler University in the 1996–97 NCAA Division I men's basketball season. Their head coach was Barry Collier, serving in his 8th season at the school. The Bulldogs played their home games at Hinkle Fieldhouse as members of the Midwestern Collegiate Conference. Butler finished first in the MCC regular season standings and won the MCC tournament to receive the conference's automatic bid to the NCAA tournament – the school's first of three NCAA Tournament appearance in a four period under Collier. As No. 14 seed in the Midwest region, the Bulldogs were beaten by No. 3 seed Cincinnati, 86–69 to finish the season with a record of 23–10 (12–4 MCC).

Roster

Schedule and results

|-
!colspan=9 style=| Regular season

|-
!colspan=9 style=| MCC tournament

|-
!colspan=9 style=| NCAA tournament

References

Butler
Butler Bulldogs men's basketball seasons
Butler
Butler Bulldogs men's basketball
Butler Bulldogs men's basketball